Cassytha filiformis or love-vine is an orangish, wiry, parasitic vine in the family Lauraceae. It is found in coastal forests of warm tropical regions worldwide including the Americas, Indomalaya, Australasia, Polynesia and tropical Africa.

It is an obligate parasite, meaning it cannot complete its life-cycle without another host plant. Research in Florida (in southeast United States) has found that love-vine inhibits gall wasps by attacking the galls (small growths on plants) that the wasps create for their young.

Description

Vines 
Cassytha filiformis is a twining vine with yellow or orange to pale green hollow stems with a length between 3–8 metres long. The stems attach to host plants by growing shoots from the base of its root, they have haustoria that fold inside the hosts' phloem and xylem membranes to absorb water and nutrients for a long time until they dry up and die.

Leaves are reduced to scales about 1 mm long and can be seen near stem ends.

Flowers and fruit 
Flowers are borne in spikes 1–2 cm long from short stalks or sometimes solitary. There are six curved inward tepals made of 3 outer oval ones 1 mm long and three inner ones 2.5 mm long. Each one has smooth (glabrous) and broad stamens with short pointy ends forming into a beak shape.

Fruit is a round and green or whitish drupe about 7 mm in diameter. Its juicy flesh is eaten and dispersed by birds.

Uses and relationship with humans 
In the Malay Peninsula, the stems are dried and powdered to make a liquid substance to stimulate hair growth.

Pregnant women in Polynesia drink juice from the vines for 4 weeks before their babies' due date to reduce pains giving birth.

In the Caribbean region, it is one of several plants known as "love vine" because it has a reputation as an aphrodisiac.

The 1889 book 'The Useful Native Plants of Australia records that the "This and other species of Cassytha are called " Dodder-laurel." The emphatic name of "Devil's guts" is largely used. It frequently connects
bushes and trees by cords, and becomes a nuisance to the traveller. "This plant is used by the Brahmins of Southern India for seasoning their buttermilk. (Treasury of Botany?)".

Gall wasps 
A 2018 study revealed how a southern Florida subspecies of this widespread species is involved in a newly discovered form of trophic interaction involving gall-forming cynipid wasps. New tendrils will actively seek out galls made by the gall wasp, Belonocnema treatae, on leaves of a host oak tree, Quercus geminata. The findings show that galls attacked by haustoria were associated with a 45% less survival rate for the wasps, suggesting that C. filiformis has an important negative impact on gall wasp survival. In the study, other species of plant and wasp galls are parasitised by this plant in the southern Florida area too.

References

External links 

 Love Vine at Center for Aquatic and Invasive Plants, University of Florida
 

filiformis
Plants described in 1753
Taxa named by Carl Linnaeus
Pantropical flora
Parasitic plants
Flora of Australia
Flora of Florida
Flora of Texas
Flora of South America
Flora of Mexico
Flora of China
Flora of Japan
Flora of Madagascar
Flora of South Africa
Flora of tropical Asia
Flora of the Lesser Sunda Islands
Flora of Hawaii